Melanopolia frenata is a species of beetle in the family Cerambycidae. It was described by Henry Walter Bates in 1884. It is known from Gabon and the Democratic Republic of the Congo.

Varietas
 Melanopolia frenata var. latefasciata Breuning, 1944
 Melanopolia frenata var. ligata (Jordan, 1894)
 Melanopolia frenata var. nubilosa Breuning, 1944

References

Lamiini
Beetles described in 1884